This is a list of newspapers in Cuba. Although the Cuban media is controlled by the state through propaganda laws, the national newspapers of Cuba is not directly published by the state, they are instead published by various Cuban political organizations with official approval. There are several new independent online newspapers, based mostly outside Cuba Independent digital media in Cuba, but mostly that independent media is financing by the US Government through the NED or other organizations, or in some cases, through other governments.

National newspapers 
 Granma — published by the Communist Party of Cuba 
 Juventud Rebelde — published by the Union of Young Communists 
 Trabajadores — published by the Centre of Cuban Workers 
  光华报 (Chinese language; established as La voz de los obreros y campesinos in 1928)

Regional newspapers 
 5 de Septiembre — Cienfuegos 
 Adelante — Camagüey
 Ahora — Holguín 
 El Habanero 
 Escambray — Sancti Spíritus 
 Guerrillero — Pinar del Río 
 Girón - Matanzas
 Invasor - Ciego de Ávila 
 La Demajagua - Granma
 Periódico 26 — Las Tunas 
 Sierra Maestra — Santiago de Cuba 
 Tribuna de La Habana — Havana 
 Vanguardia — Santa Clara 
 Venceremos — Guantanamo Venceremos (newspaper)

Defunct
 Gaceta de La Habana (est. 1764)
 (est. 1790)
 El Regañón (est. 1800)
 El Lince (est. 1811)
 El Habanero (est.1824)
 El Aurora (est. 1828)
 
 Diario de la Marina (1832-1961)
 La Voz del Pueblo Cubano (est. 1852)
  (1857-1858)
  (1878-1902)
 El Cubano Libre (est. 1868)
 El Dia
 El Diablo Cojuelo (est. 1869)
 La Lucha
 La Discusión (est.1889)
 Havana Post
 
 Havana Daily Telegraph
 Havana Evening News
 Havaner lebn
 El Heraldo de Cuba
 La Nacion
 La Noche
 La Prensa
 El Triunfo
 Adelante
 Atenas
 Mañana
 Avance
 Hoy (est. 1938)
  (est. 1958)
 Kubaner Idish Wort
  (1959-1961)
 El Mundo (1901-1969)
 Patria
  (1945-1959)
 Prensa Libre (Cuba), 1941-1961
 Revolución (1959-1965), "official Castro newspaper" until it merged with Hoy to form Granma

Historical newspaper archives
Archival issues of Diario de la Marina from the Digital Library of the Caribbean

See also
 Unión de Periodistas de Cuba, journalists' union, est.1963
 Media of Cuba
 Television in Cuba
 Telecommunications in Cuba
 Internet in Cuba
 Censorship in Cuba

References

This article incorporates information from the Spanish Wikipedia.

Bibliography

External links

 
 
 

Cuba
 
Newspapers